Paul Alan Sohl (born 1963) is a retired rear admiral in the United States Navy who served as Commander of the Operational Test and Evaluation Force.

Early life
Sohl is originally from Waterloo, Iowa. He holds a Bachelor of Science in aeronautical engineering from the Massachusetts Institute of Technology and a Master of Science in aeronautical and astronautical engineering from Stanford University.

Naval career
Sohl was commissioned an officer via the Naval Reserve Officers Training Corps and became a Naval Aviator in 1988. Following flight training and completion of the F/A-18C Fleet Replacement Squadron syllabus, he was assigned to Strike Fighter Squadron 113 (VFA-113), homeported at NAS Lemoore, California, during which time he was deployed during the Gulf War. In 1993, he graduated from the United States Naval Test Pilot School (USNTPS), a command in which he would later serve as the executive officer and commanding officer.  He later served as executive officer and commanding officer of Fleet Readiness Center Southeast (FRCSE) at NAS Jacksonville, Florida and Commander, Naval Test Wing Pacific. Other command positions Sohl has held include Commander of the Naval Air Warfare Center, Weapons Division and Commander, Fleet Readiness Centers (COMFRC). He has also been deployed to serve in Operation Enduring Freedom and was named Commander, Operational Test and Evaluation Force (COMOPTEVFOR) in 2016. 

Awards Sohl has received include the Legion of Merit and the Defense Meritorious Service Medal.

References

External links
Official Navy Biography

1963 births
Living people
Place of birth missing (living people)
People from Waterloo, Iowa
MIT School of Engineering alumni
Military personnel from Iowa
United States Naval Aviators
United States Navy personnel of the Gulf War
Stanford University School of Engineering alumni
United States Naval Test Pilot School alumni
Recipients of the Legion of Merit
United States Navy rear admirals (upper half)